Xanthophyllum stipitatum is a plant in the family Polygalaceae. The specific epithet  is from the Latin meaning "stalked", referring to the ovary of the flower.

Description
The smooth bark is grey or pale brown. The flowers are white, drying black.

Distribution and habitat
Xanthophyllum stipitatum grows naturally in Sumatra, Peninsular Malaysia and Borneo. Its habitat is hill, riverine or peatswamp forests (occasionally kerangas forest) from sea-level to  altitude.

References

stipitatum
Flora of Sumatra
Flora of Peninsular Malaysia
Flora of Borneo
Plants described in 1874
Taxa named by Alfred William Bennett